State Route 41 (SR 41) is a  state highway that runs south-to-north through portions of Calhoun, Randolph, Terrell, Webster, Marion, Talbot, Meriwether, and Coweta counties in the southwestern and west-central parts of the U.S. state of Georgia. The route connects the Morgan area to Moreland, via Buena Vista, Manchester, Warm Springs, and Greenville.

Route description
SR 41 begins at an intersection with SR 45 (North Bermuda Street) just north of Morgan, in Calhoun County. The route travels through rural areas of the county before it very briefly runs along the Calhoun–Randolph county line. Then, it enters Randolph County proper. It continues to the north and enters Shellman. On the far northeastern edge of town, it begins a brief concurrency with US 82/SR 50. At the end of the concurrency, the three highways reach the Randolph–Terrell county line. Then, it travels to the northwest and curves to the north-northeast before entering Webster County. In Weston, it intersects SR 520. Northeast, in Preston, is a one-block concurrency with US 280/SR 27 (Hamilton Street). Just before leaving town, it meets the southern terminus of SR 153. The road heads north-northwest, traveling very briefly along the Webster–Marion county line. Then, it curves to the north-northeast and meets the western terminus of SR 30 before it curves back to the north-northwest. Just before entering Buena Vista, it passes by Marion County Airport. In town, the highway intersects SR 26 (6th Avenue). Three blocks later, it intersects SR 137 (3rd Avenue). The two routes run concurrent to the west. One block later, at Baker Street, SR 41/SR 137 turn to the north after meeting the northern terminus of SR 41 Connector. Just over  later, the two routes head to the west-northwest and curve to the northwest. Just outside town, the two highways diverge, with SR 41 gradually curve more to the north and meets the southern terminus of SR 352 along the way. It heads due north, passing Melton Lake. Then, it begins a gradual curve to the northwest, meeting the western terminus of SR 127 and the southern terminus of SR 267 along the way. After that, it curves to the due north and crosses over Juniper Creek into Talbot County. SR 41 joins US 80/SR 22/SR 540 in a concurrency to Geneva. At the meeting point of the western terminus of SR 96, US 80/SR 22/SR 41 turn to the left. The concurrency continues into Talbotton. They intersect SR 90/SR 208 (Clark Street). The latter route joins the concurrency until Monroe Street. Just over four blocks later, SR 41 departs to the north on Washington Avenue and then crosses over Lazer Creek. Farther to the north, in Greens Mill, SR 36 begins a concurrency to the north-northeast. The two routes enter Woodland, where SR 36 splits off onto 1st Street. SR 41 curves to the west-northwest and meets the eastern terminus of SR 116 before traveling to the northwest. Just before entering Manchester, US 27 Alternate/SR 85 begin a concurrency with it. US 27 Alternate and SR 41 are concurrent for the remainder of SR 41's length. Then, they cross into Meriwether County. At 2nd Street, US 27 Alternate/SR 41 turn to the left, while SR 85 continues to the northeast. Then, at 5th Avenue, the two routes turn right. The concurrency curves to the northwest and meet the western terminus of SR 85 Spur (Perry Street). On the northwestern edge of town, they meet the southern terminus of SR 173 (Raleigh Road). They continue to the northwest and enter Warm Springs, where they intersect SR 85 Alternate (Whitehouse Highway). Just before leaving town, they pass Warm Springs Medical Center. Right after passing the Roosevelt Memorial Golf Course, they meet the eastern terminus of SR 194 (Durand Highway). They head north and pass Brae-Tam Lake and Roosevelt Memorial Airport. In Harris City, the two highways pass Phillips Lake and intersect SR 18, which joins the concurrency. In Greenville, they intersect SR 109, which joins the concurrency around the town square. Here, SR 18 splits off to the east. US 27 Alternate/SR 41 continue to the north-northwest and pass through rural areas of the county and enter Luthersville. In town, they meet the southern terminus of SR 54 Spur (Park Street). Less than  later, they intersect SR 54 (Oak Street). Just under  after leaving town, they enter Coweta County. The two routes pass through rural areas of the county and intersect US 29/SR 14 on the southeastern edge of Moreland. At this intersection, SR 41 meets its northern terminus, while the other three routes continue to the north-northwest into Newnan.

The following portions of SR 41 are part of the National Highway System, a system of routes determined to be the most important for the nation's economy, mobility, and defense
The entire length of the concurrency with US 82/SR 50 from the far northern part of Shellman to a point northeast of the city
The entire length of the US 280/SR 27 concurrency in Preston

Major intersections

Buena Vista connector route

State Route 41 Connector (SR 41 Connector) is a  connector route that exists entirely within the central part of Marion County. Its routing is completely within the city limits of Buena Vista.

It begins at an intersection with SR 26, one block west of the SR 41 mainline. The highway heads nearly due north until it meets its northern terminus, an intersection with SR 41/SR 137.

SR 41 Connector is not part of the National Highway System, a system of roadways important to the nation's economy, defense, and mobility.

See also

References

External links

 
 Georgia Roads (Routes 41 - 60)

041
Transportation in Calhoun County, Georgia
Transportation in Randolph County, Georgia
Transportation in Terrell County, Georgia
Transportation in Webster County, Georgia
Transportation in Marion County, Georgia
Transportation in Talbot County, Georgia
Transportation in Meriwether County, Georgia
Transportation in Coweta County, Georgia